Kornblatt's Delicatessen is a Jewish deli in Portland, Oregon.

Description 
Kornblatt's Delicatessen is a Jewish deli with a "spacious, relaxed" dining room in northwest Portland's Northwest District. The exterior has a brick facade and a green awning. The breakfast menu includes bagels with lox, blintzes, hashes, and omelettes, and lunch options include corned beef and Reuben sandwiches, latkes, and Matzo ball soup. The delicatessen is not considered kosher and many menu options include dairy and meat.  Organic chicken basil sausage, knishes, kugel, macaroni salad, and smoked fish have also been on the menu. The deli served a dozen sandwiches, as of 2016, including eight Reubens, beef tongue, chopped liver and egg salad, French dip with au jus, and hoagies. Bagels are boiled daily and fish are imported from the East Coast weekly. Hebrew National supplies beef hot dogs and salami. Thumann's Deli also supplies meats.

History 
Mike Heffernan has owned the deli.  John Callahan frequented the deli, as of 2006.

In 2021, for Hanukkah, the deli offered take-home platters. The Long Island Sound platter had smoked fish with assorted bagels and schmears.

Reception 
In 2008, Douglas Perry of The Oregonian said of the restaurant's latkes: "The most authentic version is at Kornblatt's, where it comes out gnarly on the edges and soul satisfyingly soft inside." In 2011, T magazine's Jordan Michelman said Kornblatt's was "one of the truly great New York delis outside the five boroughs" and wrote, "this displaced ode to New York deli counter culture strives for authenticity (Nova lox, pickles and meats imported from New York City), and yet it can't help but reflect the differences between Manhattan and Portland". The Oregonian's Licky Acker ranked Kornblatt's number 14 on a 2019 list of Portland's top 25 corned beef hashes. She wrote, "Kornblatt’s makes you feel comfortable. It's a place with regulars, and a fine spot." Daniel Barnett and Brooke Jackson-Glidden included Kornblatt's in Eater Portland's 2021 list of "8 Real-Deal Bagel Shops in Portland". The duo described Kornblatt's as "a quintessential East Coast-style" deli and recommended the nova lox and cream cheese bagel, as well as the house whitefish and the sun-dried tomato and basil schmear as bagel toppings.

See also

 List of Jewish delis

References

External links 

 
 Kornblatt's Delicatessen at Zomato

Jewish American cuisine
Jewish delicatessens
Jews and Judaism in Portland, Oregon
Northwest District, Portland, Oregon
Restaurants in Portland, Oregon